City of Glass is a book by Canadian author Douglas Coupland, published by Douglas and McIntyre in 2000, featuring short essays and photographs of his home town of Vancouver, British Columbia. Each essay deals with a different aspect of the city, such as the glass condominium towers which dominate the Vancouver skyline and give the book its title. It also includes the short story "My Hotel Year", which first appeared in Coupland's Life After God (1994), and the essay on another Vancouver landmark, Lions' Gate Bridge, which was published in Polaroids from the Dead (1996). An updated version of the text was released in 2009.

Canadian-born artist Una Knox produced the majority of photographic images for this book.

Titles of the Essays

The book is broken down into essays, titled with bold section headings. The essays are alphabetical, with a few artistic insertions and juxtapositions.

The essays are:

Inspiration
The book jacket’s text describes Coupland’s influence and motivation to write this book.

References 

2000 non-fiction books
Books by Douglas Coupland
Canadian non-fiction books
Books about Canada
Douglas & McIntyre books
Works about Vancouver